Idia immaculalis, the immaculate idia, is a litter moth of the family Erebidae. The species was first described by George Duryea Hulst in 1886. It is found in North America from at least California, north and east across Montana to southern Alberta and Saskatchewan.

The wingspan is 35–39 mm. Adults are on wing from June to August.

References

External links

Herminiinae
Moths of North America
Moths described in 1886